Phytoecia humeralis is a species of beetle in the family Cerambycidae. It was described by Waltl in 1838, originally under the genus Saperda. It is known from Palestine, Greece, Georgia, Iran, Azerbaijan, Syria, Cyprus, and Turkey. It feeds on Silybum marianum.

Varietas
 Phytoecia humeralis var. mersinensis (Pic, 1900)
 Phytoecia humeralis var. frontalis Chevrolat, 1882
 Phytoecia humeralis var. scapulata Mulsant, 1851

References

Phytoecia
Beetles described in 1838